Hydrocoryne is a genus of cyanobacteria belonging to the family Nostocaceae.

Species:
 Hydrocoryne spongiosa Schwabe ex Bornet & Flahault

References

Nostocales
Cyanobacteria genera